In programming, a gotcha is a valid construct in a system, program or programming language that works as documented but is counter-intuitive and almost invites mistakes because it is both easy to invoke and unexpected or unreasonable in its outcome.

Example 
The classic gotcha in C/C++ is the construct
if (a = b) code;
It is syntactically valid: it puts the value of b into a and then executes code if a is non-zero. Sometimes this is even intended. However most commonly it is a typo: the programmer probably meant
if (a == b) code;
which executes code if a and b are equal. Modern compilers will usually generate a warning when encountering the former construct (conditional branch on assignment, not comparison), depending on compiler options (e.g., the -Wall option for gcc). To avoid this gotcha, there is a recommendation to keep the constants in the left side of the comparison, e.g. 42 == x rather than x == 42. This way, using = instead of == will cause a compiler error (see Yoda conditions). Many kinds of gotchas are not detected by compilers, however.

See also
 Usability

References

Further reading

External links

 C Traps and Pitfalls by Andrew Koenig
 C++ Gotchas A programmer's guide to avoiding and correcting ninety-nine of the most common, destructive, and interesting C++ design and programming errors, by Stephen C. Dewhurst

Computer programming folklore
Programming language folklore
Programming language design